A Piece of Sky is a 2002 French-Belgian drama film directed by Bénédicte Liénard. It was screened in the Un Certain Regard section at the 2002 Cannes Film Festival.

Cast
 Séverine Caneele as Joanna
 Sophie Leboutte as Claudine
 Yolande Moreau as Madame Pasquier
 Josiane Stoléru as Mme. Picri
 Naïma Hirèche as Naima
 Annick Keusterman as Annick
 Gaëlle Müller as Laurette
 Béatrice Spiga as Bella
 Olivier Gourmet as Joanna's Lawyer
 André Wilms as Warden

Production
Director Bénédicte Liénard said It was Bella (played by Béatrice Spiga, a real prisoner in her life) who showed Séverine Caneele the posture of the naked body search.

References

External links

2002 films
2002 drama films
French drama films
2000s French-language films
Belgian drama films
French-language Belgian films
2000s French films